The 35th International 500-Mile Sweepstakes was held at the Indianapolis Motor Speedway on Wednesday, May 30, 1951. The event was part of the 1951 AAA National Championship Trail, and was also race 2 of 8 in the 1951 World Championship of Drivers. For the second year in a row, no European Formula One-based teams entered the race.

Duke Nalon, who had suffered serious burns in a crash in 1949, and who missed the 1950 race, made a comeback at Indy by winning the pole position in a Novi.

Heavy attrition saw only eight cars running at the finish. Winner Lee Wallard's car lost its brakes, suffered a damaged exhaust pipe, and broke a shock absorber mounting. In addition to the unbearably uncomfortable ride, Wallard had worn a fire retardant outfit, created by dipping his uniform in a mixture of borax crystals and water. Due to not wearing an undershirt, Wallard suffered serious chafing, and required treatment at the infield hospital after the victory lane celebration. It was estimated he lost 15 pounds during the race.

Wallard's winning car had the smallest displacement in the field. About a week after winning the race, Wallard suffered severe burns in a crash at Reading, which effectively ended his professional racing career.

Three-time winner Mauri Rose, in his 15th Indy start, crashed and flipped on lap 126. It was his final 500, as he retired from driving after the crash.

Time trials
Time trials were scheduled for six days. Rain, however, pushed qualifying into a seventh day.

Saturday May 12 – Pole Day time trials
Sunday May 13 – Second day time trials
Saturday May 19 – Third day time trials
Sunday May 20 – Fourth day time trials
Saturday May 26 – Fifth day time trials
Sunday May 27 – Sixth day time trials (rained out)
Monday May 28 – Seventh day time trials (rain makeup day)

Box score 

Notes
 – Includes 1 point for fastest lead lap

Alternates
First alternate: Bob Sweikert  (#37)

Failed to Qualify

Jean Achard (real name - Jean-Jacques Grosman)  (R) (#100) - Did not appear
Frank Armi  (#35, #58, #64)
Manny Ayulo (#31)
Joe Barzda  (#49)
Bill Boyd  (#42)
Jimmy Bryan  (#72)
Bill Cantrell (#62, #79)
Jimmy Daywalt  (#33, #47)
Kenny Eaton  (#66)
Myron Fohr (#56)
George Fonder (#29, #53, #63)
Potsy Goacher  (#45)
Jackie Holmes (#24, #45)
Norm Houser (#61)
Jerry Hoyt (#14)
Bill Johnson  (#15)
Danny Kladis (#89)
Ray Knepper  (#78)
Bayliss Levrett (#46)
Mark Light  (#33)
George Lynch (#36)
Dick Page  (#64)
Roscoe Rann  (#14)
Gordon Reid  (#67)
Paul Russo (#7)
Mike Salay (#41)
Bob Scott  (#82)
Bud Sennett  (#51)
Doc Shanebrook  (#77)
Roy Sherman  (#57)
Joel Thorne (#88)
Johnnie Tolan  (#34)
Leroy Warriner  (#75)

Notes 
 Pole position: Duke Nalon – 4:23.74 (136.498 mph)
 Fastest Lead Lap: Lee Wallard – 1:07.26 (133.809 mph)
 Ayulo (100 laps) and McGrath (100) shared the same car. Points for 3rd position were shared between the drivers.
Roger Penske stated in a live interview on RTV6 in Indianapolis on November 4, 2019, when the Penske Corporation was announcing the purchased of all the IMS assets, that 1951 was the first race he attended at the Indianapolis Motor Speedway.

Championship standings after the race 

World Drivers' Championship standings

 Note: Only the top five positions are listed. Only the best 4 results counted towards the Championship.

Broadcasting

Radio
The race was carried live on the radio through a network arrangement set up by 1070 WIBC-AM of Indianapolis. Mutual, which had carried the race for several years, had raised its advertising rates for 1951, and lost its primary sponsor for the event, Perfect Circle Piston Rings. As a result, Mutual dropped the coverage altogether. Local station WIBC stepped in to cover the race, and provided its feed to various Mutual affiliates. A total of 26 stations carried the broadcast.

WIBC personality Sid Collins served as the chief announcer in the booth, and the remainder of the crew consisted mostly of WIBC talent. Jim Shelton reported from his familiar turn four location, and Bill Fox was also in the booth. Easy Gwynn was also to be part of the crew. Collins interviewed the winner in victory lane, leaving Fox to call the actual finish of the race. Like the Mutual broadcasts, WIBC featured live coverage of the start (30 minutes), the finish (30 minutes), and 15-minute live updates throughout the race. The on-air crew was smaller than normal. There were not turn and pit reporters stationed around the entire track, instead recorded interviews were played back during later broadcast segments.

References

External links
Indianapolis 500 History: Race & All-Time Stats – Official Site
Van Camp's Pork & Beans Presents: Great Moments From the Indy 500 – Fleetwood Sounds, 1975
1951 Indianapolis 500 at RacingReference.info (Relief driver statistics)

Indianapolis 500 races
Indianapolis 500
Indianapolis 500
Indianapolis
1951 in American motorsport